Raumarais Park is a suburb of Johannesburg, South Africa. The suburb lies north of Bramley. It is located in Region E of the City of Johannesburg Metropolitan Municipality.

History
The suburb is situated on part of an old Witwatersrand farm called Syferfontein. It is named after the land owner Magdelena Johanna Rautenbach née Marais. It became a suburb on 30 July 1947.

References

Johannesburg Region E